Aliens in the Attic is a 2009 American comic science fiction film directed by John Schultz and written by Mark Burton and Adam F. Goldberg, based on an original story conceived by Burton. Starring: Carter Jenkins, Austin Butler, Ashley Tisdale, Gillian Vigman, Andy Richter, Doris Roberts, Robert Hoffman, Kevin Nealon, Tim Meadows, Josh Peck, J. K. Simmons, Kari Wahlgren and Thomas Haden Church, the plot revolves around the children in the Pearson family defending their vacation home against a group of aliens, who are planning an invasion of Earth until one of the aliens betrays them and joins the Pearson children in battle.

Produced by Regency Enterprises and Dune Entertainment, Aliens in the Attic was released theatrically by 20th Century Fox on July 31, 2009 in the United States. The film received mixed reviews from film critics and failed at the box office, earning merely $57.9 million on a $45 million budget.

Plot
A meteor shower rockets through the dark galaxy. Four glowing pods hide behind the meteor shower. Suddenly the four glowing pods make a hard right and head towards the distant planet Earth. 

In a Chicago suburb, Stuart Pearson (Kevin Nealon), and his wife Nina (Gillian Vigman), head a family that includes 7-year-old Hannah (Ashley Boettcher), 17-year-old Bethany (Ashley Tisdale), who goes on secret outings with her boyfriend Ricky Dillman (Robert Hoffman), and 15-year-old techno-geek Tom (Carter Jenkins). After arguing with Tom over hacking into his school's website to change his grades, Stuart takes his family to a lakeside holiday home in Creek Landing, Michigan. Joining them is Nathan "Nate" Pearson (Andy Richter), his 14-year-old show off son Jake (Austin Butler), identical 12-year-old gamer twins Art (Henri Young) and Lee (Regan Young), and Nana Rose (Doris Roberts). Ricky also arrives unexpectedly and talks his way into staying overnight, by giving the impression that his car broke down (he secretly took out one of the plugs) so he can spend time with Bethany.

As the family settles in, dark storm clouds swirl around the house and the four glowing pods land on the roof. A crew of little aliens emerges, made up of Skip (J. K. Simmons), a nasty, tough commander, Tazer (Thomas Haden Church), an ugly muscle-bound soldier armed to the teeth, Razor (Kari Wahlgren), a violent female soldier, and Sparks (Josh Peck), the four-armed engineer, and the only non-threatening member. Since the aliens crashed into the satellite dish, Ricky and Tom are sent to fix it. In the attic, Ricky then reveals to Tom that he lied about his car breaking down, and being 18, Ricky is actually in college and four years older than Bethany. Ricky sends Tom to fix the satellite dish by himself, but it is broken beyond repair. Investigating further, Tom and Jake discover the aliens. Ricky is shot by Tazer with a dart-like "mind control plug", allowing the aliens to control him via remote.

Called "Zirkonians", the aliens plan to take over Earth and make Ricky attack the boys, but Tom and Jake manage to escape with Hannah and the twins' help. Tazer shoots them with mind control plugs but they fall off harmlessly; the devices do not work on kids. The group calls 911, but sheriff Doug Armstrong (Tim Meadows), doesn't believe them and scolds them while the aliens cut the phone wire. The kids decide to protect the adults by keeping the aliens' existence a secret. Tom creates a potato gun and repels the first alien attack from the attic. In the process, they obtain Ricky's controller and turn against the aliens. The kids orchestrate a scheme to get the adults out of the house and then ambush the aliens as they try to reach the basement via the air vents, gentle and non-violent Sparks ends up becoming separated from the group and inside Hannah's room, where the latter befriends him he reveals that he wants to return to his family. 

Sparks helps the kids by creating weapons for them and reveals his teammates are after a machine called the "Sizematron", buried under the basement for many years that will allow the Zirkonians to invade the planet. The kids forgot their grandmother, and the aliens' mind controlled her. Which gives her superhuman strength and agility, but they obtain, and she defeats Ricky (now back in alien control) in a scene reminiscent of a fighting video game. However, the aliens manage to capture Jake and Sparks, whom they need to complete their mission - while Bethany discovers the aliens' existence. 

While rescuing Jake in the basement, Ricky insults Tom and the others and breaks up with Bethany because she always talks about feelings and family. The kids attack the aliens and rescue Sparks, but Skip succeeds in using the Sizematron machine, growing 30 feet tall and calls the Zirkonian invasion ships, prompting the kids to mind-control Skip into sending him and a grown Tazer back to the machine as Sparks has controlled it to shrink. Tazer and Razor (who have fallen in love) flee, while Skip is sucked into the damaged machine, which explodes. Sparks calls off the invasion and returns home to planet Zirkon after bidding farewell to the kids. Having grown closer towards each other the whole time, the kids resume their vacation and enjoy a day of fishing together with their parents, while Skip, having survived the explosion yet shrunk to an even smaller size than before, reappears bent on revenge, only for a crow to snatch him away and meets his demise.

In a mid-credits scene, Bethany and Tom get their revenge on Ricky by making him look like a fool in front of his new girlfriend Annie Filkins, using the mind control remote; Bethany gleefully comments that "she is so keeping this" after she and Tom make Ricky land on his testicles on the stair rail.

Cast
 Carter Jenkins as Thomas "Tom" Pearson
 Austin Butler as Jake Pearson
 Ashley Tisdale as Bethany Pearson
 Ashley Boettcher as Hannah Pearson
 Robert Hoffman as Richard "Ricky" Dillman
 Henri Young as Art Pearson
 Regan Young as Lee Pearson
 Kevin Nealon as Stuart "Stu" Pearson
 Gillian Vigman as Nina Pearson
 Andy Richter as Nate Pearson
 Doris Roberts as Nana Rose Pearson
 Tim Meadows as Sheriff Doug Armstrong
 Malese Jow as Julie
 Megan Parker as Brooke
 Maggie VandenBerghe as Annie Filkins

Voice cast
 Josh Peck as Sparks
 J. K. Simmons as Skip
 Thomas Haden Church as Tazer
 Kari Wahlgren as Razor

Production

Development
In March 2006, 20th Century Fox announced that they picked up Mark Burton and Adam F. Goldberg's script for the film, then titled They Came from Upstairs. Marc Resteghini was hired to oversee the film for Fox with Kara Francis Smith for Regency Enterprises. Barry Josephson was confirmed as the main producer for the film while Thor Freudenthal was initially hired to direct the film, but was later replaced by John Schultz. Pre-production on the film began in March 2007.

In January 2008, Ashley Tisdale was cast in the film as Bethany Pearson; Robert Hoffman, Carter Jenkins and Austin Butler were later cast as well. Doris Roberts  signed onto the film in February 2008. MTV later confirmed that Josh Peck joined the cast as the voice of the alien Sparks. Tisdale recorded a song titled "Switch" for the film, which was also included in her second album, Guilty Pleasure. The original motion picture soundtrack was released on August 18, 2009.

Filming
Principal photography began at the end of January 2008 in Auckland, New Zealand. Auckland-based production company New Upstairs Productions stated that filming would run for 30–40 days from January 28 to April 18, 2008 with no filming in weekends. The film was shot in a rambling old villa transported from Remuera to a farm in North Auckland. The main set was an old manor and the crew spent $700,000 restoring the house. Principal photography ended in mid-March 2008, though Tisdale, Butler and Jenkins returned to the set for reshoots in April 2009.

Release
Aliens in the Attic was originally scheduled to be released in January 2009, but was pushed back to July 31, 2009. The United Kingdom release also coincided with a charity auction for Save the Children which teamed up with eBay and 20th Century Fox where various celebrities, including several actors from the film, sold items from their attics to raise money for the charity.

Home media 
The film was released on DVD and Blu-ray on November 3, 2009.

Reception

Critical response
Reviews of Aliens in the Attic were mixed; the film holds a 34% "rotten" rating on Rotten Tomatoes based on 74 reviews with an average critical score of 4.60/10, with the consensus stating: "Inoffensive and kid-friendly, this mundane family comedy is light on imagination." On Metacritic, the film has an average score 42 out of 100 based on 10 reviews, indicating "mixed or average reviews". Audiences polled by CinemaScore gave the film an average grade of "B+" on an A+ to F scale.

Entertainment Weekly described the film as "a pointless and harmless family adventure that doesn't mentally assault the 12-and-over set and looks like a lot of fun", while San Francisco Chronicle called it unoriginal and crowd pleasing. Variety stated the film would appeal primarily to a more narrow demographic of tweens and preteens and despite Tisdale's presence, it’s difficult to imagine many ticket buyers between the ages of 12 and 18 while The New York Times described Jenkins and Butler as the actors with more personality and Hoffman as the actor who provides the film’s occasional funny moments and stated that even though she is credited as one of the main characters, Tisdale spends most of the film off-screen.

The Los Angeles Times called the film "an enjoyable kid-friendly film but not an out-of-this-world classic" and also mentioned the film belonged to Hoffman, and Kirk Honeycutt of The Hollywood Reporter said director John Schultz "played everything for laughs and earns a more than a few but tech effects deliver a fair number of those laughs" and described the film as an "amusing family comedy". Radio Times gave the film a three out of five stars rating, saying that the film is "a thrilling children's yarn with enough pop-culture references to hold grown-ups' interest".

The Dove Foundation praised the film, saying it is "one of those movies that you find to be better than anticipated" and also said the film draws on realism in family dynamics. Lara Martin of Digital Spy described the film as a "kid-friendly mix of Men in Black crossed with Gremlins with a healthy dose of Home Alone-style violence" and also mentioned that one of the biggest disappointments in the movie is the lack of screen time given to Tisdale, billed as one of the leading actors, who "gets a promising start as she rebels against her parents and struts around in her bikini, but she's quickly relegated to background fodder purely there to provide excess opportunities for the alien-controlled Ricky to shine" and concluded saying it seems "a bizarre and sad waste of her obvious comedic talent". The Miami Herald gave the film a mixed review, describing it as a "children's movie mix of live-action and animation, it has a few positive messages, a few laughs and a few comic throwdowns".

Box office
Aliens in the Attic grossed $8 million its opening weekend while playing in 3,108 theaters, ranking No. 5 at the North American box office. The film ended its theatrical run on November 22, 2009, having grossed $$25,200,412 domestically and $32,680,644 overseas for a worldwide total of $57,881,056.

Accolades 
 2009 Teen Choice Awards
 Movie Star: Female – Ashley Tisdale (Nomination)
 2010 Young Artist Awards
 Young Ensemble Cast: Megan Parker, Henri Young, Regan Young, Austin Robert Butler, Carter Jenkins (Nomination)

Video game
A video game is based on the movie of the same name that was released on August 4, 2009, in North America, followed by an international release on August 6, 2009. The game developers were Revistronic for the Wii,PlayStation 2, and Microsoft Windows platforms and Engine Software for the Nintendo DS, published by Playlogic. The game features follow the storyline of the movie and it was available for  Wii, PlayStation 2, Nintendo DS Nintendo 3ds, and Microsoft Windows. The game also offers players two different gameplay perspectives depending upon which video game platform players choose. The game allows to play as Tom, Hannah, Jake, Art, Lee, Bethany or Sparks, Skip, Tazer and Razor across 15 missions.

References

External links

 
 
 
 
 

2009 films
2000s English-language films
2009 comedy films
2000s science fiction comedy films
2000s children's comedy films
American science fiction comedy films
American children's comedy films
Films set in Michigan
Films shot in New Zealand
Films scored by John Debney
Alien invasions in films
Regency Enterprises films
Dune Entertainment films
20th Century Fox films
Films directed by John Schultz (director)
2000s American films
Films about children
Films about extraterrestrial life
Films about revenge
Films about size change
Films about vacationing
Nintendo DS games
PlayStation 2 games
Wii games
Windows games